Srisailam mandal is one of the 54 mandals in Nandyal district of the Indian state of Andhra Pradesh. It is under the administration of new formed Atmakur revenue division and the headquarters are located at Srisailam Project (RFC) Township.

Demographics 

 census, the mandal had a population of 31,834. The total population constitute, 16,917 males and 14,917 females —a sex ratio of 882 females per 1000 males. 3,447 children are in the age group of 0–6 years, of which 1,789 are boys and 1,658 are girls. There are 20,644 literates.

Jurisdiction 

 census, the mandal has three villages with one town.

The settlements in the mandal are listed below:

See also 
 List of mandals in Andhra Pradesh

References 

Mandals in Kurnool district